Visa requirements for Rwandan citizens are administrative entry restrictions by the authorities of other states placed on citizens of the Rwanda. As of 2 July 2019, Rwandan citizens had visa-free or visa on arrival access to 54 countries and territories, ranking the Rwandan passport 89th in terms of travel freedom (tied with the passports of Gabon, Guinea, Senegal and Togo) according to the Henley Passport Index.

Visa requirements map

Visa requirements

Dependent, Disputed, or Restricted territories
Unrecognized or partially recognized countries

Dependent and autonomous territories

See also

Visa policy of Rwanda
Rwandan passport
Visa requirements for Burundian citizens
Visa requirements for Congo DR citizens
Visa requirements for Kenyan citizens
Visa requirements for South Sudanese citizens
Visa requirements for Tanzanian citizens
Visa requirements for Ugandan citizens

References and Notes
References

Notes

Rwanda
Foreign relations of Rwanda